Tagus Estuary Natural Reserve is a natural reserve in Portugal. It is one of the 30 areas which are officially under protection in the country. The estuary of the Tagus River is the largest wetland in the country and one of the most important in Europe, a sanctuary for fish, molluscs, crustaceans, and especially to birds that stop-over on their migration between northern Europe and Africa.

Characterization 

Around the estuary a saltmarsh has developed which is a zone of high productivity of polychaetes, molluscs and crustaceans, is an important breeding area for various fish species. However, it is the water birds which give the Tagus estuary its international importance. The flocks of wintering species reach up to about 120,000 individuals. The counts regularly carried out in this protected area during the winter show more than 10,000 ducks and 50,000 shorebirds. In the case of the pied avocet (Recurvirostra avosetta), up to 25% of the population wintering in Europe has been counted on the Tagus Estuary. The many other species present attest to the biological richness and value for nature conservation in this region: the greater flamingo (Phoenicopterus roseus), greylag goose (Anser anser), the dunlin (Calidris alpina), black-tailed godwit (Limosa limosa), hen harrier (Circus cyaneus), osprey (Pandion haliaetus), bluethroat (Luscina svecica), common firecrest (Regulus ignicapillus) and Eurasian penduline tit (Remiz pendulinus).

In the wetlands around the estuary nesting birds include red-crested pochard (Netta rufina), little bittern (Ixobrychus minutus), little egret (Egretta garzetta) and purple heron (Ardea purpurea), marsh harrier (Circus aeruginosus],  Montagu's harrier (Circus pyagurgus), black-winged stilt (Himantopus himantopus), collared pratincole (Glareola pratincola) and little tern (Sternula albifrons).  While the associated redbeds contain great reed warbler (Acrocephalus arundinaceus), Savi's warbler (Locustella luscinioides) and other warblers. The nearby fields have stone-curlew (Burhinus oedicnemus) and calandra lark (Melanocorypha calandra) breed on adjacent farmland. Little bustard (Tetrax tetrax) occurs all year but is more numerous in winter.  Raptors which may be seen over the fields include black-winged kite (Elanus caeruleus), short-toed eagle (Circaetus gallicus) and booted eagle (Aquila pennatus).

Nearby patches of woodland hold short-toed treecreeper (Certhia brachydactyla), European nightjar (Caprimulgus europaeus), red-necked nightjar (Caprimulgus ruficollis), Iberian magpie (Cyanopica cooki) and many passerines.

During the Spring and Autumn many species stopover on the Tagus during their migration these include curlew sandpiper (Calidris ferruginea) in large numbers with many other shorebirds in smaller numbers, common redshank (Tringa totanus) and black-tailed godwits reach their peak numbers during migration too. Other migrants which may be seen include Eurasian spoonbill (Platalea alba), Mediterranean gull (Larus melanocephalus) and black tern (Chlidonias niger) and many passerines.

Conservation status 
 1976 - Is created the Natural Reserve of the Tagus Estuary, through Decree-Law No. 565/76.
 1980 - Moves to make the Wetlands of International Importance by the Ramsar Convention.
 1994 - Is hereby established a Special Protection Area for Wild Birds, under Directive 79/409/EEC.

References

Nature reserves in Portugal
Ramsar sites in Portugal
Geography of Lisbon District
Natura 2000 in Portugal
Tagus